Paradoxopla sinuata is a moth of the  family Lasiocampidae. It is found from India to Taiwan.

Subspecies
Paradoxopla sinuata sinuata (India)
Paradoxopla sinuata taiwana (Wileman, 1915) (Taiwan)
Paradoxopla sinuata fabulosa Zolotuhin, 2005 (Vietnam)
Paradoxopla sinuata orientalis Lajonquière, 1976 (China)

References

Moths described in 1879
Lasiocampidae